Firefighters Against Cuts was a political party formed in 2003 which fought a small number of seats in the 2003 United Kingdom local elections. It was registered on 20 March 2003.

Gerard MacMillan stood for Busby Ward, East Renfrewshire.

Fergus Richardson, a union leader of the Fire Brigades Union during the UK firefighter dispute 2002–03 stood for South Ayrshire Council. John Maitland also stood for Annbank Mossblown St Quivox Ward for the same council.

References

External links
 

2003 establishments in the United Kingdom
Defunct political parties in the United Kingdom
Fire and rescue in the United Kingdom
Anti-austerity political parties in the United Kingdom